This is a list of the National Register of Historic Places listings in El Paso County, Texas.

This is intended to be a complete list of properties and districts listed on the National Register of Historic Places in El Paso County, Texas. There are 13 districts, one National Historic Landmark, 45 individual properties, and one former property listed on the National Register in the county. Two of these sites are State Historic Sites. Nine sites are also listed as Recorded Texas Historic Landmarks including three that are State Antiquities Landmarks.

Current listings

The publicly disclosed locations of National Register properties and districts may be seen in a mapping service provided.

|}

Former listings

|}

See also

National Register of Historic Places listings in Texas
List of Texas State Historic Sites
Recorded Texas Historic Landmarks in El Paso County

References

External links

Historical Markers Project, El Paso Community College Survey of thirty-three historic sites in the El Paso area, with research materials, interviews, and summary materials

Registered Historic Places
 
El Paso